The expedition against the Banu Saleem tribe, also known as the Al Kudr Invasion, occurred directly after the Battle of Badr in the year A.H. 2 of the Islamic calendar. The expedition was ordered by Muhammad after he received intelligence that the Banu Salim were planning to invade Madina.

This was Muhammad's first interaction with the people of Bahrain. He had gotten news that some tribes were amassing an army on march from Bahrain.

Muhammad responded by launching a pre-emptive strike against their base in Al Kudr which was a watering place at the time. When the tribe heard of this, they fled. Muhammad captured 500 of their camels from the raid, and distributed them between his fighters. He also kept a fifth of the spoils as khums.

This event is mentioned in Ibn Hisham's biography of Muhammad and other historical books. Modern secondary sources which mention this include the award-winning book Ar-Raheeq Al-Makhtum (The Sealed Nectar).

See also
List of expeditions of Muhammad

Notes

624
Campaigns led by Muhammad